Guddemane Appaiah Gowda was an Indian freedom fighter and revolutionary, he instated a peasant army from Kodagu and became its commander in-chief to lead the Amara Sullia Rebellion in 1837. They were successful in hoisting the native flag after lowering the Union Jack, which is known to be the first-ever freedom movement against the East India Company. They established a civil government in Mangalore for 13 days under his leadership.

Early life

Guddemane Appaiah Gowda was born in 1792, the eldest son of Guddemane Subbaiah at Balamuri village in Kodagu. He belonged to the Arebhashe community.

Appaiah initially served as a Jemadar under King Linga Rajendra II of Kodagu. He was later promoted as Subedar during the rule of Chikka Virarajendra.

Contributions

The people of Kodagu were ordered to pay the heavy tax to the East India Company. In opposition to this, Appaiah Gowda built his own army and became its commander-in-chief. He led the Amara Sullia Rebellion along with leaders like Kedambadi Ramaiah Gowda. They  ruled for 13 days in Mangalore's Bautagudde. Under his leadership, the Native Jangama flag was hoisted in Mangalore's Bautagudde. Appaiah and his associates established a civil government and ruled for 13 days. Until they were defeated by the British troops.

Death

Guddemane Appaiah Gowda was hanged in front of Madikeri Fort on 31 October 1837 at 10-45 AM, sentenced as an open traitor by the Company rule in India.

Legacy

A bronze statue of Guddemane Appaiah Gowda was unveiled by D. V. Sadananda Gowda at Field Marshal K.M. Cariappa Circle in Madikeri.
Demands have been made to include the contribution of Guddemane Appaiah Gowda in school textbooks.

Reference

People from Kodagu district
Indian independence movement
History of social movements
History of India
Indian revolutionaries
1792 births
1837 deaths
Revolutionary movement for Indian independence
Executed revolutionaries
19th-century executions by British India
Executed Indian people
People executed by British India by hanging